The Branxton Advocate: Greta and Rothbury Recorder was an English language newspaper that was published in Branxton, New South Wales Australia.  There is only one known issue, which was published on 4 March 1916.

History 
The Branxton Advocate: Greta and Rothbury Recorder has only one known issue.  This issue published on a variety of topics including women's interests, notes on the war, general interest topics, poetry and advertising.

Digitisation 
The various versions of the paper have been digitised as part of the Australian Newspapers Digitisation Program project hosted by the National Library of Australia.

See also 
 List of newspapers in New South Wales

References

External links 
 

Defunct newspapers published in New South Wales
Newspapers on Trove